The 1964 United States presidential election in North Carolina took place on November 3, 1964, and was part of the 1964 United States presidential election.  Voters chose 13 representatives, or electors to the Electoral College, who voted for president and vice president.

North Carolina voted for incumbent Democratic President Lyndon B. Johnson, with 56.15 percent of the vote, over Republican nominee Barry Goldwater, who obtained 43.85 percent. , this is the last election when the following counties voted for a Democratic presidential candidate: Wayne, Moore, and Lenoir.

Results

Results by county

References

North Carolina
1964
1964 North Carolina elections